Colomokee is an unincorporated community in Early County, in the U.S. state of Georgia.

History
A post office called Colomokee was established in 1896, and remained in operation until 1905. A variant name was "Kolomoki". The community takes its name from Kolomoki Creek.

See also
Kolomoki Mounds

References

Unincorporated communities in Early County, Georgia
Unincorporated communities in Georgia (U.S. state)